The Masonic Temple at 230 Pine Ave. in downtown Long Beach, California was built in 1903.  It is listed on the List of City of Long Beach historic landmarks.

It is "one of the last remaining examples of eminent local architect Henry F. Starbuck, who designed many of the city's turn-of-the-century buildings."

It was renovated and restored in the 1980s, and was remodelled in the 1990s for use by Z Gallerie, a store. It is now an events venue.

References

Downtown Long Beach
Former Masonic buildings in California
Masonic buildings completed in 1903
Culture of Long Beach, California
Buildings and structures in Long Beach, California
Landmarks in Long Beach, California